Mersin İdmanyurdu (also Mersin İdman Yurdu, Mersin İY, or MİY) Sports Club; located in Mersin, east Mediterranean coast of Turkey in 1981–82. At the end of 1981–82 season Mersin İdmanyurdu has promoted to First League for the fourth time. The 1981–82 was the eighth season of Mersin İdmanyurdu (MİY) football team in Second League, the second level division in Turkey. They finished 1st in Group C.

Mersin İdmanyurdu Executive Committee was consisting of the following: Mehmet Fatih Deveci (president), Mahir Turan and Mustafa Nihat Sözmen (vice-presidents), Remon Kumdereli (general captain), Mircan Fırat (general secretary), Hamit Hayfavi (audit), Mehmet Biricik (captain of amateur branches), Şefik Balcı (treasurer), Aydın Özlü (club physician), Sever Yıldızçelik, Ramazan Balta, Özge Cadun, Basil Dumani, Nesimi Sağay and Erol Tarhan (members).  The club's address was: "Atatürk Cad. Toros Ofis İşhanı, Kat: 3 Mersin" "Telefon: 153 17".

Candan Dumanlı became the head coach. His assistant was Kahraman Karataş. İlhami Özata was press officer.

Pre-season
Preparation games: 
 MİY – Hatayspor: 0–0. 
 MİY – Adana Demirspor: 1–1. 
 MİY – Ceyhanspor: 3–1.
 16.08.1981 - İskenderunspor – MİY: 0–2.

1981–82 Second League participation
In its 19th season (1981–82) Second League was played with 60 teams, 15 in four groups: Group A, Group B, Group C and Group D. Group winners promoted to First League 1982–83. Bottom teams in each group relegated to promotion league (Third league was abandoned previous year). Mersin İY became 1st with 21 wins and 46 goals in Group C. No second league championship game played starting from 1980–81.

Results summary
Mersin İdmanyurdu (MİY) 1981–82 Second League Group C league summary:

Sources: 1981–82 Turkish Second Football League pages.

League table
Mersin İY's league performance in Second League Group C in 1981–82 season is shown in the following table.

Note: Won, drawn and lost points are 2, 1 and 0. F belongs to MİY and A belongs to corresponding team for both home and away matches.

Results by round
Results of games MİY played in 1981–82 Second League Group C by rounds:

First half

Mid-season
Preparation games:
 24.01.1982 - MİY-Sakaryaspor.
 31.01.1982 - MİY-Beşiktaş: 2-0.

Second half

1981–82 Turkish Cup participation
1981–82 Turkish Cup was played for the 20th season as Federasyon Kupası by 146 teams. First elimination round was played in one-leg elimination system. Second through sixth elimination rounds and finals were played in two-legs elimination system. Mersin İdmanyurdu participated in 1981–82 Turkish Cup from round 2 and was eliminated at round 6 (1/16) by Samsunspor. Samsunspor was eliminated at quarterfinals. Galatasaray won the Cup for the 7th time and became eligible for 1982–83 European Cup Winners' Cup.

Cup track
The drawings and results Mersin İdmanyurdu (MİY) followed in 1981–82 Turkish Cup are shown in the following table.

Note: In the above table 'Score' shows For and Against goals whether the match played at home or not.

Game details
Mersin İdmanyurdu (MİY) 1981–82 Turkish Cup game reports is shown in the following table.
Kick off times are in EET and EEST.

Source: 1981–82 Turkish Cup (Federasyon Kupası) pages.

Management

Club management
Mehmet Fatih Deveci was club president.

Coaching team

1981–82 Mersin İdmanyurdu head coaches:

Note: Only official games were included.

1981–82 squad
Stats are counted for 1981–82 Second League matches and 1981–82 Turkish Cup (Federasyon Kupası) matches. In the team rosters five substitutes were allowed to appear, two of whom were substitutable. Only the players who appeared in game rosters were included and listed in the order of appearance.

Sources: 1981–82 season squad data from maçkolik com, Milliyet, and Cem Pekin Archives.

News from Milliyet:
 Transfers: Suat, Esat (Fenerbahçe (in exchange for Özcan)), Sertaç (Ankaragücü), Muammer (Ankara Demirspor), Levent (İskenderunspor), Memik (Tarsus İdmanyurdu), Metin (Sirkeci), Abdülkadir (Trabzonspor), Şükrü (İstanbulspor). 
 Team squad: Salih, Atıf, Tahir, Esat, Mustafa, İsmail, Abdülkadir, Muammer, Şükrü, M.Ali, B.Levent, K.Levent, Nasır, Raşit, Levent, Kemal, Ömer, Suat, Sertaç, Memik, Sılan, Haluk. 
 Galatasaray coach Birch did not want and Öner loaned from Galatasaray, 26.10.1981. 
 Özcan Balta was capped in U-18 national team in European championship organized in Hama, Finland between 21–30 May 1982. Turkey was in the same group with Scotland, Holland and Albania.
 Kemal went to Galata Gençlik in Summer 1982. Reşit (Vefa Simtel)

See also
 Football in Turkey
 1981–82 Turkish Second Football League
 1981–82 Turkish Cup

Notes and references

Mersin İdman Yurdu seasons
Turkish football clubs 1981–82 season